Matricaria aurea is a species of plants in the family Asteraceae.

Sources

References 

Flora of Malta
Matricaria